Van Dammes are a Finnish four-piece garage punk band from Helsinki, originally formed in Brussels in 2013.

Already their first recording, The VD EP, was noted in various music blogs in 2014. It was also the New Music Show's record of the week on Radio Helsinki. As their fast and concise style became more known, the second EP, Better Than Sex, gained attention of the two major Finnish music magazines Rumba and Soundi in 2015. The EP was recorded in a same place where Ramones performed in the 1970s. It includes tributes to a Yugoslav flight attendant Vesna Vulović and a man called Frank Tower who supposedly survived the sinking of three ocean liners. Van Dammes have also released a tribute song to a Japanese ski jumper legend Noriaki Kasai. In 2017, with their third EP, Vild Days, Van Dammes dug deep into the oldest roots of punk.

Van Dammes have actively toured Europe, and are currently recording for German Rockstar Records.

Discography

Extended plays 
 The VD EP (2014)
 Better Than Sex (2015)
 Vild Days (2017)
 Risky Business (2019)
 Finally There (2021)

Singles 
 Vesna (Flash in the Night) (2015)
 Thunderbirds Are Go (2016)

Compilations 
 The Best of (2017)

Music videos 
 Daniel (2014)
 (Let's) Go (2014)
 Olé, Olé, Olé (2014)
 Lisbon, I Promise You (2014)
 Mr Noriaki Kasai (2014)
 Vesna (Flash in the Night) (2015)
 Frank Tower (2016)
 Thunderbirds Are Go (2016)
 Punk Rock Drummer (2017)
 Every Fourth Year (2017)
 Risky Business (2019)
 Tax Free World (2020)
 Finally There (2021)

References 

Musical groups from Helsinki
Finnish punk rock groups
2013 establishments in Belgium
Garage punk groups
Musical groups established in 2013